Mária Jasenčáková, born 21 October 1957 in Spišská Sobota, Poprad, Czechoslovakia, is a Slovak luger who competed at five Olympic Games between 1980 and 1998. She is the first Slovak to compete at five Olympics.

See also
List of athletes with the most appearances at Olympic Games

External links
 

1957 births
Slovak female lugers
Czechoslovak female lugers
Living people
Lugers at the 1980 Winter Olympics
Lugers at the 1984 Winter Olympics
Lugers at the 1992 Winter Olympics
Lugers at the 1994 Winter Olympics
Lugers at the 1998 Winter Olympics
Olympic lugers of Slovakia
Olympic lugers of Czechoslovakia
Sportspeople from Poprad